Progempylus is an extinct genus of prehistoric snake mackerel that lived during the lower Eocene.

See also

 Prehistoric fish
 List of prehistoric bony fish

References

Eocene fish
Prehistoric life of Europe
Gempylidae